Anastasiya Winkel (born 23 October 1993) is a German sailor. She competed in the women's 470 event at the 2020 Summer Olympics.

While representing her home country of Ukraine at the 2014 Junior European Championships, Winkel met her future husband Malte Winkel, who was competing for Germany. After having a long-distance relationship, she moved to Germany in 2016 and became a naturalized citizen in 2021.

References

External links
 
 
 

1993 births
Living people
German female sailors (sport)
Olympic sailors of Germany
Sailors at the 2020 Summer Olympics – 470
People from Alchevsk
Ukrainian female sailors (sport)
Ukrainian emigrants to Germany
Naturalized citizens of Germany
German people of Ukrainian descent